The Georgian Rugby Union (GRU) (Georgian: საქართველოს რაგბის კავშირი) is the governing body for the sport of rugby union in the nation of Georgia. Founded in 1964, it was part of the Rugby Union of the Soviet Union until 1991, with the Independent Georgian Rugby Union being established on May 27, 1991. It organizes the Georgia Championship, Georgia Cup, the Georgia national rugby union team and the Georgia XV national rugby union team. It became affiliated to World Rugby, then known as the International Rugby Football Board, in 1992. It is based in Tbilisi.

See also
Georgia national rugby union team
Rugby union in Georgia

External links
 Georgian Rugby Union official site:
 Georgian, with full content
 English, under construction

Rugby union in Georgia (country)
Rugby union governing bodies in Europe
Rugby Union
World Rugby members
Sports organizations established in 1964
1964 establishments in Georgia (country)